This is a list of 180 species in Phenacoccus, a genus of mealybugs in the family Pseudococcidae.

Phenacoccus species

 Phenacoccus abditus Borchsenius, 1949 c g
 Phenacoccus acericola King, 1902 c g
 Phenacoccus aceris (Signoret, 1875) c g b  (apple mealybug)
 Phenacoccus affinis Ter-Grigorian, 1963 c g
 Phenacoccus alibotush Gavrilov g
 Phenacoccus alienus De Lotto, 1961 c g
 Phenacoccus alleni McKenzie, 1964 c g
 Phenacoccus alonim Ben-Dov, 1991 c g
 Phenacoccus alticola Bazarov, 1967 c g
 Phenacoccus americanus King & Cockerell, 1897 c g
 Phenacoccus angophorae Williams, 1985 c g
 Phenacoccus angustatus Borchsenius, 1949 c g
 Phenacoccus arambourgi Balachowsky, 1954 c g
 Phenacoccus arctophilus (Wang, 1979) c g
 Phenacoccus artemisiae Ehrhorn, 1900 c g
 Phenacoccus arthrophyti Archangelskaya, 1930 c g
 Phenacoccus asphodeli Goux, 1942 c g
 Phenacoccus asteri Takahashi, 1932 c g
 Phenacoccus avenae Borchsenius, 1949 c g
 Phenacoccus avetianae Borchsenius, 1949 c g
 Phenacoccus azaleae Kuwana, 1914 c g
 Phenacoccus baccharidis Williams, 1987 c g
 Phenacoccus balachowskyi Savescu, 1984 c g
 Phenacoccus balagnus Balachowsky, 1933 c g
 Phenacoccus basorae Bodenheimer, 1943 c g
 Phenacoccus bazarovi Ben-Dov, 1994 c g
 Phenacoccus betae Moghaddam g
 Phenacoccus bicerarius Borchsenius, 1949 c g
 Phenacoccus borchsenii (Matesova, 1957) c g
 Phenacoccus brachipodi (Savescu, 1985) c g
 Phenacoccus caillardi (Balachowsky, 1930) c g
 Phenacoccus cajonensis McKenzie, 1967 c g
 Phenacoccus capensis Ferris, 1950 c g
 Phenacoccus cassiniae Williams, 1985 c g
 Phenacoccus celtisifoliae Hollinger, 1917 c g
 Phenacoccus cerasi Savescu, 1985 c g
 Phenacoccus colemani Ehrhorn, 1906 c g
 Phenacoccus convolvuli Savescu, 1985 c g
 Phenacoccus cotyledonis De Lotto, 1964 c g
 Phenacoccus crassus Granara de Willink, 1983 c g
 Phenacoccus cynodontis Borchsenius, 1949 c g
 Phenacoccus cyrenaicus Ferris, 1922 c g
 Phenacoccus dearnessi King, 1901 c g
 Phenacoccus defectus Ferris, 1950 c g
 Phenacoccus desertus Bazarov & Nurmamatov g
 Phenacoccus destitutus McKenzie, 1967 c g
 Phenacoccus dicoriae McKenzie, 1961 c g
 Phenacoccus discadenatus Danzig, 1978 c g
 Phenacoccus echeveriae McKenzie, 1960 c g
 Phenacoccus ejinensis Tang in Tang & Li, 1988 c g
 Phenacoccus eleabius Silvestri, 1915 c g
 Phenacoccus elongatus Kanda, 1943 c g
 Phenacoccus emansor Williams & Kozarzhevskaya, 1988 c g
 Phenacoccus eremicus Ferris, 1950 c g
 Phenacoccus eriogoni Ferris, 1918 c g
 Phenacoccus eschscholtziae McKenzie, 1961 c g
 Phenacoccus eugeniae Takahashi, 1942 c g
 Phenacoccus eurotiae Danzig, 1975 c g
 Phenacoccus evelinae (Tereznikova, 1968) c g
 Phenacoccus ferulae Borchsenius, 1949 c g
 Phenacoccus fici Takahashi, 1940 c g
 Phenacoccus formicarum Leonardi, 1908 c g
 Phenacoccus franseriae Ferris, 1921 c g
 Phenacoccus fraxinus Tang, 1977 c g
 Phenacoccus giganteus McKenzie, 1964 c g
 Phenacoccus gobicus Danzig, 1987 c g
 Phenacoccus gorgasalicus Hadzibejli, 1960 c g
 Phenacoccus gossypii Townsend & Cockerell, 1898 c g
 Phenacoccus graminicola Leonardi, 1908 c g
 Phenacoccus grandicarpus Hollinger, 1917 c g
 Phenacoccus gregosus Williams & Granara de Willink, 1992 c g
 Phenacoccus gypsophilae Hall, 1927 c g
 Phenacoccus hakeae Williams, 1985 c g
 Phenacoccus halimiphylli Danzig, 1968 c g
 Phenacoccus halli Ezzat, 1962 c g
 Phenacoccus hargreavesi (Laing, 1925) c g
 Phenacoccus helianthi (Cockerell, 1893) c g
 Phenacoccus herbaceus Borchsenius, 1962 c g
 Phenacoccus herreni Cox & Williams, 1981 c g
 Phenacoccus hordei (Reuter, 1904) c g
 Phenacoccus hortonarum Brachman & Kosztarab in Kosztarab, 1996 c g
 Phenacoccus hurdi McKenzie, 1964 c g
 Phenacoccus hystrix (Baerensprung, 1849) c g
 Phenacoccus incertus (Kiritshenko, 1940) c g
 Phenacoccus incomptus McKenzie, 1964 c g
 Phenacoccus indicus (Avasthi & Shafee, 1980) c g
 Phenacoccus infernalis McKenzie, 1962 c g
 Phenacoccus insularis Danzig, 1971 c g
 Phenacoccus interruptus Green, 1923 c g
 Phenacoccus iranica Moghaddam g
 Phenacoccus isadenatus Danzig, 1971 c g
 Phenacoccus juniperi Ter-Grigorian, 1964 c g
 Phenacoccus kaplini Danzig, 1983 c g
 Phenacoccus karaberdi Borchsenius & Ter-Grigorian, 1956 c g
 Phenacoccus kareliniae Borchsenius, 1949 c g
 Phenacoccus karkasicus Moghaddam g
 Phenacoccus kokandicus Nurmamatov, 1986 c g
 Phenacoccus larvalis Borchsenius, 1949 c g
 Phenacoccus latipes Green, 1923 c g
 Phenacoccus longoi Russo, 1994 c g
 Phenacoccus lotearum McKenzie, 1960 c g
 Phenacoccus lycii (Ferris, 1919) c g
 Phenacoccus madeirensis Green, 1925 i c g
 Phenacoccus manihoti Matile-Ferrero, 1977 c g
 Phenacoccus maritimus Danzig, 1971 c g
 Phenacoccus matricariae Savescu, 1984 c g
 Phenacoccus megaulus McKenzie, 1967 c g
 Phenacoccus memorabilis Borchsenius, 1949 c g
 Phenacoccus menieri Matile-Ferrero & Balachowsky, 1972 c g
 Phenacoccus meridionalis Gómez-Menor Ortega, 1948 c g
 Phenacoccus mexicanus (Miller & McKenzie, 1971) c g
 Phenacoccus meymeryani Bodenheimer, 1943 c g
 Phenacoccus minimus Tinsley, 1898 c g
 Phenacoccus monieri Balachowsky, 1939 c g
 Phenacoccus montanus (Hadzibejli, 1959) c g
 Phenacoccus multisetosus McKenzie, 1967 c g
 Phenacoccus neohordei Marotta, 1992 c g
 Phenacoccus nephelii Takahashi, 1939 c g
 Phenacoccus nurmamatovi Bazarov, 1979 c g
 Phenacoccus orcinus De Lotto, 1964 c g
 Phenacoccus parietariae (Lichtenstein, 1881) c g
 Phenacoccus parietaricola Goux, 1938 c g
 Phenacoccus parvus Morrison, 1924 i c g
 Phenacoccus pauculus De Lotto, 1964 c g
 Phenacoccus pauperatus Ferris, 1950 c g
 Phenacoccus pergandei Cockerell, 1896 c g
 Phenacoccus perillustris Borchsenius, 1949 c g
 Phenacoccus persimplex Borchsenius, 1949 c g
 Phenacoccus peruvianus Granara de Willink, 2007 g
 Phenacoccus phenacoccoides (Kiritshenko, 1932) g
 Phenacoccus piceae (Löw, 1883) c g
 Phenacoccus poriferus Borchsenius, 1949 c g
 Phenacoccus pratti Takahashi, 1951 c g
 Phenacoccus prodigialis Ferris, 1950 c g
 Phenacoccus prosopidis Bodenheimer, 1943 c g
 Phenacoccus proximus De Lotto, 1974 c g
 Phenacoccus prunispinosi Savescu, 1984 c g
 Phenacoccus pseudopumilus Hadzibejli, 1960 c g
 Phenacoccus psidiarum Cockerell, 1903 c g
 Phenacoccus pumilus Kiritshenko, 1936 c g
 Phenacoccus pyramidensis Ezzat, 1960 c g
 Phenacoccus quadricaudata (Signoret, 1875) c g
 Phenacoccus querculus (Borchsenius, 1949) c g
 Phenacoccus radii Bodenheimer, 1943 c g
 Phenacoccus rehaceki Savescu, 1984 c g
 Phenacoccus rotundus Kanda, 1943 c g
 Phenacoccus rubivorus Cockerell, 1901 c g
 Phenacoccus sakai (Takahashi, 1951) c g
 Phenacoccus salsolae Danzig, 1975 c g
 Phenacoccus salviacus Moghaddam g
 Phenacoccus schmelevi Bazarov, 1980 c g
 Phenacoccus segnis (Brain, 1915) c g
 Phenacoccus setiger Borchsenius, 1949 c g
 Phenacoccus sherbinovskyi Bodenheimer, 1943 c g
 Phenacoccus shutovae Danzig, 1971 c g
 Phenacoccus silvanae Longo & Russo in Longo et al., 1989 c g
 Phenacoccus similis Granara de Willink, 1983 c g
 Phenacoccus sogdianicus Nurmamatov & Bazarov, 1987 c g
 Phenacoccus solani Ferris, 1918 i c g b  (solanum mealybug)
 Phenacoccus solenopsis Tinsley, 1898 c g
 Phenacoccus specificus Matesova, 1960 c g
 Phenacoccus sphaeralceae Williams, 1987 c g
 Phenacoccus sphagni (Green, 1915) c g
 Phenacoccus stelli (Brain, 1915) c g
 Phenacoccus stipae Nurmamatov, 1986 c g
 Phenacoccus strigosus Borchsenius, 1949 c g
 Phenacoccus subdeserticus Vayssière, 1932 c g
 Phenacoccus surinamensis  i
 Phenacoccus tataricus Matesova, 1960 c g
 Phenacoccus tergrigorianae Borchsenius in Borchsenius & Ter-Grigorian, 1956 c g
 Phenacoccus tibialis Borchsenius, 1949 c g
 Phenacoccus transcaucasicus Hadzibejli, 1960 c g
 Phenacoccus transvcaucasicus Hadzibejli, 1960 g
 Phenacoccus trichonotus (Danzig, 1971) c g
 Phenacoccus tucumanus Granara de Willink, 1983 c g
 Phenacoccus ulmi (Savescu, 1985) c g
 Phenacoccus vaccinii (Danzig, 1960) c g
 Phenacoccus viburnae Kanda, 1931 c g
 Phenacoccus wilmattae Cockerell, 1901 c g
 Phenacoccus yerushalmi Ben-Dov, 1985 c g

Data sources: i = ITIS, c = Catalogue of Life, g = GBIF, b = Bugguide.net

References

Phenacoccus
Articles created by Qbugbot